TASC Outsourcing (pronounced: Task)  is a staffing and managed services company of the Middle East headquartered in Dubai, United Arab Emirates. TASC Outsourcing was founded in November 2007 by Mahesh Shahdadpuri in Dubai and has its operations, through its branches and network, across the Arab states of the Persian Gulf which includes the UAE, Saudi Arabia, Qatar, Kuwait, Bahrain and Oman. It has a turnover of almost $100 million. Since 2007, TASC has built teams for over 200 businesses within the GCC, including free zones.

History 
TASC Outsourcing started in November 2007 as a small I.T. staffing company, with an initial capital of around $150,000. TASC Outsourcing won its first major client in 2008 and had grown to a company with contractor base of over 3,000 people by 2015. TASC Outsourcing was named the fastest growing company in the Middle East in 2011 and 2012. TASC Outsourcing was ranked in top 100 SMEs in Dubai SME 100 in 2013. In 2014, LinkedIn named TASC Outsourcing one of the most influential brands in the UAE. In 2015, TASC began using Ramco Systems' enterprise resource planning. TASC is a recipient of the prestigious Sheikh Khalifa Excellence Award in 2016 and in 2018 (Silver Category). TASC became a Superbrand in 2017 and has recently been awarded the prestigious Sheikh Mohammed bin Rashid al Maktoum Business Award in 2019 Now TASC Outsourcing is doing staffing services for professional based in 27 countries. Over the past decades, TASC has built teams for over 200 organizations within the GCC.

Services 
TASC Outsourcing has a number of services available:
 Contract staffing
 Permanent recruitment
 On Demand staffing
 Employee deployment services
 Statement of work
 Promoter management
 Recruitment process outsourcing
 Global talent outsourcing
Payroll Outsourcing
Statement of Work
Manpower Supply

TASC Outsourcing has also launched an online hiring portal for temporary jobs

Subsidiaries 
Tasc Temp is the first online temporary staffing agency in the GCC. Companies are offered temporary staffing for their urgent, ad-hoc and short-term needs. TascTemp.com enables companies to recruit staff online within half-a-day. The temporary staff are pre-screened, interviewed and visa ready. The entire process is fully compliant with UAE labour laws.

Top Talent specializes in oil and gas staffing services in Abu Dhabi, UAE. Top Talent also provides staffing in the field of technology and dotcom.

Awards 

 Dubai Quality Appreciation Award (2020)
 LinkedIn Talent Award: Top Innovation Staffing Agency (2019)
 Sheikh Mohammed bin Rashid al Maktoum Business Award (2019)
 Superbrand Award (2019, 2018 & 2017)
 Bloomberg Business week recognizes CEO Mahesh Shahdadpuri as the 'Game Changer of Outsourcing in the Middle East 2018' 
 Seamless Retail Award: Best Website Launch of the Year 2018 for www.tasctemp.com 
 Forbes: Top 100 Indian Business Owners in the Arab world (2018, 2017, 2015)
 Sheikh Khalifa Excellence award for Business Excellence (2016)
 MENA Customer Delight Award (2016)
 CEO Middle East Award (2014)
 Entrepreneur: Innovator of the year (2014)
 Dubai SME 100 award (2013) 
 Arabia Fast 500 winner for (2012)

References

Service companies of the United Arab Emirates
Outsourcing companies
Emirati companies established in 2007
Business services companies established in 2006